Juan Rejas (born 14 August 1962) is a Peruvian weightlifter. He competed in the men's light heavyweight event at the 1984 Summer Olympics.

References

External links
 

1962 births
Living people
Peruvian male weightlifters
Olympic weightlifters of Peru
Weightlifters at the 1984 Summer Olympics
Place of birth missing (living people)
20th-century Peruvian people
21st-century Peruvian people